The Cannone da 70/15 was a mountain gun was used by Italy during World War I. By World War II it had been relegated to the infantry gun role in units assigned to Italian East Africa.

Background 
The 70/15 was designed in 1902 by Italian artillery Captain Regazzi to replace the Canonne da 7 BR Ret. Mont. that was first introduced in 1881.  The 70/15 was technically obsolescent when it went into service in 1904 but it took the Italians almost a decade to field its replacement the Cannone da 65/17 modello 08/13.

Design 
The 70/15 was a breech-loaded mountain gun with an interrupted screw breech, a box trail carriage, two wooden-spoked steel-rimmed wheels, and two seats on the axles for the gunners. There was no recoil mechanism, no gun shield, no traversing mechanism, and elevation was controlled by a jackscrew beneath the breech.  It could be broken down into four mule loads for transport or hooked to a limber for towing.

History 
The 70/15 was first used during the Italo-Turkish War by the 3rd Mountain Artillery Regiment.  The 70/15 was still in service during World War One due to insufficient numbers of more modern replacements.  Due to its light, simple, inexpensive, and rugged construction Vickers-Terni built 710 70/15s from 1914-1919, and it remained in colonial service throughout World War II.  It was gradually phased out of the mountain role and given a new role as an infantry support gun.

After World War One most were transferred to the Italian Border Guard.  At the outbreak of World War Two, 92 guns were still in service with the I Group/1° GaF Artillery, the VII Group/2° GaF Artillery, and IIbis Group/3° GaF Artillery in Albania.  In Italian East Africa, the 70/15 was used by the XCI Colonial Artillery Group/XCI Colonial Brigade, the XCII Colonial Artillery Group/XCII Colonial Brigade, and the CI Colonial Artillery Group.

Photo Gallery

References 

 

World War I artillery of Italy
World War II weapons of Italy
World War II artillery of Italy
Mountain artillery
70 mm artillery